Johann Balthasar König (baptised 28 January 1691 – buried 2 April 1758) was a German Baroque composer, especially of hymn melodies, having published a hymnal with 1,913 melodies. He was the church musician at Frankfurt's main Protestant church, the Katharinenkirche, and the town's Kapellmeister. He was also closely associated with Georg Philipp Telemann.

Career 
Born in Waltershausen, König was a son of Johann Jakob König. He was in Frankfurt a chorister of the municipal gymnasium. He joined the municipal chapel when Georg Philipp Telemann was its director.

König married in 1717 Anna Maria Pfaff, the daughter of a tailor. Telemann became the godfather of their son Georg Philipp, born in 1718. König was appointed director of the chapel at the Katharinenkirche. He was promoted to municipal Kapellmeister (director of music) in 1727, succeeding Johann Christoph Bodinus (1690–1727).

König composed several hymns, cantatas and operas. His most important work is the 1738 collection Harmonischer Liederschatz, with 1,913 melodies, of which 358 were not published before. The full title reads: 

Martin Rößler, who analyzed the melody for Liederkunde zum Evangelischen Gesangbuch which supplies scholarly background information of songs in the EG, summarized that it follows the "emotional elements" of the text well by a focus on expansion at the beginning, and on concentration at the beginning of the abgesang, is well structured and offers some word painting.

Literature 
 Peter Cahn: Kirchenmusik an St. Katharinen. In: Joachim Proescholdt (ed.): St. Katharinen zu Frankfurt am Main. Verlag Waldemar Kramer, Frankfurt am Main, 1981.
 Christiana Jungius: Telemanns Frankfurter Kantatenzyklen. Bärenreiter, Kassel 2008, pp 84–109.

References

External links 
 
 
 
 Johann Balthasar König (Composer) Bach Cantatas Website 2006
 Johann Balthasar König hymnary.org
 Harmonischer Lieder-Schatz reader.digitale-sammlungen.de
 Johann Balthasar König / Komponist, Musikdirektor Deutsche Digitale Bibliothek
 Johann Balthasar Konig, "I have found the ground" on YouTube

German Baroque composers
People from Waltershausen
1691 births
1758 deaths
Music directors